Anolis pseudopachypus is a species of lizard in the family Dactyloidae. The species is found in Panama.

References

Anoles
Reptiles described in 2007
Endemic fauna of Panama
Reptiles of Panama
Taxa named by Gunther Köhler